The 2009 San Marino local elections were held on 7 June to elect the mayors and the councils of the nine municipalities of San Marino. Overall turnout was 55.1%. The election in the City of San Marino was declared invalid, as it didn't reach the turnout quorum. Therefore, a second election was held on 29 November.

Electoral system
Voters elected the mayor (Italian: capitano di castello) and the municipal council (giunta di castello). The number of seats was determined by law: the city councils of Chiesanuova, Faetano and Montegiardino were composed of eight members; the councils of Acquaviva, Borgo Maggiore, City of San Marino, Domagnano, Fiorentino and Serravalle were composed of 10 members.

Candidates ran on lists led by a mayoral candidate. Voters elected a list and were allowed to give up to two preferential votes. Seats were allocated with the d'Hondt method if the winner had obtained at least 60% of the votes. Otherwise, six seats would have been allocated to the winning party (five seats if the council had eight members) and the rest of the seats would have been allocated using the d'Hondt method to the rest of the parties. The winning list mayoral candidate was proclaimed mayor.

In the municipalities where only one list contested the election, the election was considered valid if the turnout was over 50% and the votes to the list were over 50% of the valid votes (votes to the list plus blank votes).

June election results
Results of the election held on 7 June.

Acquaviva

Borgo Maggiore

Chiesanuova

City of San Marino
The elections were declared invalid as the quorum of 50% turnout was not reached. As a result, the election was repeated on 29 November.

Domagnano

Faetano

Fiorentino

Montegiardino

Serravalle

November election results
On the June election, the election in the City of San Marino was declared invalid as it didn't reach the turnout quorum. The election was repeated on 29 November.

City of San Marino

References

External links
 7 June election results
 29 November election results
 Elections in San Marino

2009
2009 elections in Europe
Local election